Roberta Freeman is an American singer, best known for her work with Guns N' Roses, Pink Floyd, Cinderella, Engelbert Humperdinck, and Mary Wilson's Supremes. According to Rolling Stone, "Freeman was one of six women brought into the madness of GN’R for their marathon ‘Use Your Illusion’ tour." Fellow female musicians include Traci Amos, Cece Worrall, Lisa Maxwell, Anne King and Diane Jones."All were brought on board in the early stages of the Use Your Illusion tour in the summer of 1991, and they stuck around until it wrapped up two years later. As touring members... they played a huge role in shaping the band’s sound during their commercial peak."

Vocal Work 
In 2022 Freeman performed with Jon Batiste on We Are, which won a Grammy Award for Album of the Year during the 64th Annual Grammy Awards. In 2021, Freeman released a cover of Pink Floyd's "Wish You Were Here." Featuring Classless Act’s Derek Day, Guns N’ Roses’, Teddy Andreadis,  Jane’s Addiction’s Stephen Perkins, and Gwen Stefani’s Derek Frank. The accompanying music video was filmed at the Teragram Ballroom in Los Angeles, CA and shot by award-winning cinematographer Michael Franks. Freeman performed at the 2022, 90th Annual Hollywood Christmas Parade supporting Marine Toys for Tots with The Jet Velocity Holiday All Star Band led by Jason Ebs (Peter Criss) and Janea Chadwick Ebs (Joe Cocker & ECOTONIC), featuring Teddy Andreadis (Guns N’ Roses), Glen Sobel  (Alice Cooper), Britt Lightning (Vixen), Mitch Perry (Cher and Edgar Winter), and Adam Kury (Candlebox).   

Freeman serves as vocal director, arranger, and choreographer with Scott Page’s all-star celebrity rockstar Pink Floyd Tribute Band, Think:EXP featuring Stephen Perkins (Jane’s Addiction), Norwood Fisher (Fishbone), Kenny Olson (Kid Rock), Derek Day ( Classless Act), Tony Franklin (The Firm), Kitten Kuroi (Elvis Costello), Melonie Taylor (Bette Midler), and Carol Hatchett, and The Voice’s Will Champlin aka Kill Will, son of former Chicago member Bill Champlin.

Personal life 
A native of New York City, Freeman spent her early childhood in Brooklyn, then later moved to Co-op City with her family. She was the second of two girls born to African-American father, James Freeman, and Russian-Jewish mother, Gertrude. Her sister is award winning children's book illustrator, Laura Freeman.

Associated Acts 

Annabella Lwin
 Bee Gees
 Bernard Fowler
 Black Veil Brides
 Cinderella
 Engelbert Humperdinck
 Enrique Bunbury
 Foxy Shazam
 Freda Payne
 Gavin Christopher
 Gin Wigmore
 Gilby Clarke
 Guns N' Roses
 Hanni El Khatib
 Jade Sterling Wolf Jr.
 Jerry Harrison
 Joe Cocker
 John Mellencamp
 Johnny Kemp
 Mark Collie
 Mary Wilson
 Michael Ubaldini
 Nick Waterhouse
 Pink Floyd
 Brit Floyd
 The Pretty Reckless
 RDGLDGRN
 Secondhand Serenade
 Stevie Salas
 Sugaray Rayford
 Think:EXP
 Weezer

References

External links 

 Official website

Live Performances

Think:EXP (2018 - ) 

 "Great Gig IN The Sky" - Live at The LA WisDome (2019)
 "Great Gig IN The Sky" - Live at The LA WisDome (2019)
 "Great Gig IN The Sky" - Live at The LA WisDome (04/19)
 "Great Gig IN The Sky" - Live at The LA WisDome (12/18)
 "Money" (1/31/20)

Nick Waterhouse (2014 - ) 

 "Holly" - Promo (Full Length LP)
 Morning Becomes Eclectic  - Live on KCRW
 "Wreck the Rod" - Official Video ft. Danny Trejo

Weezer (2019) 

 The Black Album - Crush Music/Atlantic Records
 "Can't Knock the Hustle" - Weezerpedia album credit
 "Can't Knock the Hustle" - Official music video

Annabella Lwin's Bow Wow Wow (2019) 

 "I Want Candy" - Live in LA (5/25/19)

Sugaray Rayford (2019) 

 "Somebody Save Me" - Forty Below Records
 "You and I"/"Somebody Save Me"/"Is it Just Me"/"Dark Night of the Soul"

Nasty Housewives (2017 - 2018) 

 “45 Shades Of Blue”
 “Alternative Facts” (Lead Vox: Roberta Freeman)
 “Legend Of Narcissus”
 “Overrated”
 “Not My President”
 “Massacre At Bowling Green”
 “Mar- A- Lago”

Brit Floyd (2014 - 2018) 

 Official band website
 “Great Gig In The Sky” (01/2015)

The Pretty Reckless (2017) 

 Performance  on Conan -TBS (2/28/17)

Engelbert Humperdinck (2011 - 2012)

(International) Released Tour 

 "Quando, Quando, Quando" - Tel Aviv 1/12/11
 Concert Review - Manilla

Year of birth missing (living people)
Living people
American women singers
Singers from New York (state)
American session musicians
21st-century American women